To Asty was a Greek newspaper based in Athens.

References

External link 

Greek-language newspapers
Defunct newspapers published in Greece
Newspapers published in Athens
Publications established in 1885
1885 establishments in Greece
Publications disestablished in 1907
Daily newspapers published in Greece